No. 28 Squadron ( or LLv.28, from 3 May 1942 Le.Lv.28), renamed No. 28 Fighter Squadron ( or HLe.Lv.28 on 14 February 1944) was a fighter squadron of the Finnish Air Force during World War II. The squadron was part of Flying Regiment 2.

Organization

Winter War
1st Flight (1. Lentue)
Detachment Sirén (Osasto Sirén)
2nd Flight (2. Lentue)
Detachment Turkki (Osasto Turkki)
3rd Flight (3. Lentue)
Detachment Jutila (Osasto Jutila)
Detachment Räty (Osasto Räty)

The equipment consisted of 23 Morane-Saulnier M.S.406s, 10 Hawker Hurricane Is.

Continuation War
1st Flight (1. Lentue)
Detachment Turkki (Osasto Turkki)
Detachment Uola (Osasto Uola)
Detachment Sovelius (Osasto Sovelius)
2nd Flight (2. Lentue)
Detachment Ala-Panula (Osasto Ala-Panula)
3rd Flight (3. Lentue)
Detachment Hyrkki (Osasto Hyrkki)
Detachment Vuorinen (Osasto Vuorinen)

The equipment consisted of 27 Morane-Saulnier M.S.406s and 410s, 1 Mörkö-Morane, 1 Brewster Buffalo, and 8 Messerschmitt Bf 109G-2s.

Bibliography

External links
Lentolaivue 28

28